José Bruyr (18 March 1889–1980) was a 20th-century French-speaking Belgian poet.

Biography 
José Bruyr was among the founding fathers of the Académie Charles-Cros. He was also a member of the Claude Debussy committee in Saint-Germain-en-Laye. A musicographer and music critic, he has written several books on Arthur Honegger, operetta, history of music, and on composers such as Franz Schubert, Franz Liszt, Johannes Brahms, Jules Massenet, Maurice Ravel, and so on.

He was in touch with Francis Poulenc, Maurice Ravel, Alfred Cortot, Henri Dutilleux, Olivier Messiaen, the Belgian composer Marcel Orban and Russian Igor Stravinsky and Ivan Wyschnegradsky as well as musicologists Armand Panigel, Jean Roy, Antoine Goléa, Jacques Bourgeois and Léon Vallas. He was a friend of Georges Fesch, franco-belgian banker and composer, Jacques Fesch's father. José Bruyr has been involved from the beginning in the French radio show Club des amateurs de disques, later entitled . He is buried at the

References

External links 
 Franz Liszt, sa vie, son œuvre on Bookdoreille
 José Bruyr on Library of Congress
 Franz Liszt, sa vie son oeuvre Audiobook, José Bruyr on YouTube

Belgian musicologists
Belgian poets in French
Belgian music critics
1889 births
1980 deaths
20th-century musicologists
Writers about music